The 2009–10 IIHF European Women's Champions Cup was the sixth holding of the IIHF European Women Champions Cup (EWCC). Tornado Moscow Region of the Russian Women's Hockey League won the tournament for the first time, becoming the second consecutive Russian team to claim the title.

First round

Group A

Group B

Group C

Group D

Second round

Group E

Group F

Super Final

References 
Tournament statistics and data from:
"2010 IIHF European Women Champions Cup: Tournament Reports". webarchive.iihf.com. International Ice Hockey Federation. Retrieved 12 November 2020.
"Coupe d'Europe de hockey sur glace féminin 2009/10". hockeyarchives.info (in French). Retrieved 12 November 2020.
”EWCC (W) - 2009-2010”. eliteprospects.com. Retrieved 12 November 2020.

External links
 International Ice Hockey Federation

Women
IIHF European Women's Champions Cup
Euro